Quicksilver is a 2009 EP released by The Crüxshadows.  It peaked at #1 on the Billboard Hot Dance Singles Sales, and #2 on the Hot 100 Singles Sales, making it their most successful releases, tied with Birthday.

Track listing
"Quicksilver"
"Quicksilver" (radio edit)
"Avalanche"
"Quicksilver" (Dancefloor Transformation)
"Roland"

References

External links
 The Crüxshadows' official website

2009 EPs
The Crüxshadows EPs